Jay Kempe (born 21 August 1952) is a Bermudian sailor. He competed in the Tornado event at the 1992 Summer Olympics.

References

External links
 

1952 births
Living people
Bermudian male sailors (sport)
Olympic sailors of Bermuda
Sailors at the 1992 Summer Olympics – Tornado
Place of birth missing (living people)